Skutterudite is a cobalt arsenide mineral containing variable amounts of nickel and iron substituting for cobalt with the ideal formula CoAs3. Some references give the arsenic a variable formula subscript of 2–3. High nickel varieties are referred to as nickel-skutterudite, previously chloanthite. It is a hydrothermal ore mineral found in moderate to high temperature veins with other Ni-Co minerals. Associated minerals are arsenopyrite, native silver, erythrite, annabergite, nickeline, cobaltite, silver sulfosalts, native bismuth, calcite, siderite, barite and quartz. It is mined as an ore of cobalt and nickel with a by-product of arsenic.

The crystal structure of this mineral has been found to be exhibited by several compounds with important technological uses.

The mineral has a bright metallic luster, and is tin white or light steel gray in color with a black streak. The specific gravity is 6.5 and the hardness is 5.5–6. Its crystal structure is isometric with cube and octahedron forms similar to that of pyrite. The arsenic content gives a garlic odor when heated or crushed.

Skutterudite  was discovered in Skuterud Mines, Modum, Buskerud, Norway, in 1845. Smaltite is an alternative name for the mineral. Notable occurrences include Cobalt, Ontario, Skuterud, Norway, and Franklin, New Jersey, in the United States. The rare arsenide minerals are classified in Dana's sulfide mineral group, even though it contains no sulfur.

Crystal structure

The crystal structure of the skutterudite mineral was determined in 1928 by Oftedahl to be cubic, belonging to space group Im-3 (number 204). The unit cell can be considered to consist of eight smaller cubes made up of the Co atoms. Six of these cubes are filled with (almost) square planar rings of As, each of which is oriented parallel to one of the unit cell edges. The As atoms then form octahedra with Co in the center.

In crystallographic terms, the Co atoms occupy the 8c sites, while the As atoms occupy the 24g sites. The position of the Co atoms within the unit cell is fixed, while the positions of the As atoms are determined by the parameters x and y. It has been shown that for the As-rings to be fully square, these parameters must satisfy the Oftedahl relation x + y = 1/2. Any deviation from this relation yields a rectangular configuration of the As atoms; indeed, this is the case for all known compounds with this structure, and the As atoms do not form a perfect octahedron.

Together with the unit cell size and the assigned space group, the aforementioned parameters fully describe the crystal structure of the material. This structure is often referred to as the skutterudite structure.

Applications
Materials with a skutterudite structure are studied as a low cost thermoelectric material with low thermal conductivity. See also Thermoelectric materials#Skutterudite thermoelectrics.

References 

 A. Kjekshus and T. Rakke. Compounds with skutterudite type crystal-structure .3. Structural data for arsenides and antimonides. Acta Chemica Scandinavica Series A 28 (1): 99-103 1974.

Cobalt minerals
Arsenide minerals
Cubic minerals
Minerals in space group 204